is a junction railway station in the city of  Nagai, Yamagata, Japan, operated by the East Japan Railway Company (JR East) with the Yamagata Railway as a tenant.

Lines
Imaizumi Station is a station on the JR East  Yonesaka Line and is 23.0 rail kilometers from the terminus of the line at Yonezawa Station. It is also a station on the Yamagata Railway Flower Nagai Line, and is located 12.2 rail kilometers from the terminus of the line at Akayu Station.

Station layout
The station has two island platforms serving four tracks connected to the station building by a footbridge. The station has a Midori no Madoguchi staffed ticket office.

Platforms

History
Imaizumi Station opened on 15 November 1914 as a station on the Nagai Light Railway Line. The Yonesaka Line began operations from 28 September 1926. The station was absorbed into the JR East network upon the privatization of JNR on 1 April 1987, and became a station on the Yamagata Railway from 25 October 1988.

The Yonesaka Line (Imaizumi -  Hagyū) and Flower Nagai Line (Imaizumi -  Tokiniwa) share about 2 km of track. The junction point was called .

Passenger statistics
In fiscal 2016, the JR portion of the station was used by an average of 218 passengers daily (boarding passengers only). and the Yamagata Railway portion of the station was used by 612 passengers daily

Surrounding area
 
 
 Okitama Public General Hospital

See also
List of railway stations in Japan

References

External links

 JR East Station information 
  Flower Nagai Line 

Railway stations in Yamagata Prefecture
Stations of East Japan Railway Company
Yonesaka Line
Yamagata Railway Flower Nagai Line
Railway stations in Japan opened in 1914
Nagai, Yamagata